Lloyd Charles Sanders (1857 - 27 December 1927) was an English writer and biographer, known for a special knowledge of the 18th and 19th centuries, who wrote a number of volumes as well as contributing a number of entries to the Dictionary of National Biography.

The eldest son of the Rev. Lloyd Sanders, rector of Whimple, Devon, Sanders was educated as an exhibitioner of Christ Church, Oxford, taking a second class in moderations and a first in modern history, and the Standhope historical essay prize in 1880.

Sanders was a member of the Athenaeum Club in London.

Bibliography 
 Celebrities of the century: being a dictionary of men and women of the nineteenth century (edited; 1888)
 Life of Viscount Palmerston (1888) - on Lord Palmerston
 Life of Richard Brinsley Sheridan (1890) - on Richard Brinsley Sheridan
 Lord Melbourne's Papers (edited; 1890) - the papers of William Lamb, 2nd Viscount Melbourne
 History of England During the Reign of Victoria, 1837-1901 (with Sir Sidney Low; 1908)
 The Holland House Circle (1908) - on the Whig social set of Holland House
 Old Kew, Chiswick, and Kensington (1910)
 Patron and Place-Hunter, a Study of George Bubb Dodington, Lord Melcombe (1919) - on George Dodington, 1st Baron Melcombe

References

External links 
 
 

1857 births
1927 deaths
English biographers
Alumni of Christ Church, Oxford